Jacques Spiesser (born 7 June 1947) is a French actor.

Biography
After having taken courses at the Conservatoire, he made his film debut in 1972 in Nina Companeez's Faustine et le bel été with Muriel Catala.

He is best known to English-speaking audiences for playing the role of Gilles in Priceless.

Filmography

Cinema
 1972: Faustine et le bel été, directed by Nina Companeez
 1973: R.A.S., directed by Yves Boisset
 1974: The Man Who Sleeps, directed by Bernard Queysanne after Georges Perec
 1974: , directed by Édouard Molinaro
 1974: Stavisky, directed by Alain Resnais
 1974: La Gifle, directed by Claude Pinoteau
 1974: Section spéciale, directed by Costa-Gavras
 1975: Serious as Pleasure, directed by Robert Benayoun
 1975: Lumière, directed by Jeanne Moreau
 1975: Le Petit Marcel, directed by Jacques Fansten
 1976: Je suis Pierre Rivière, directed by Christine Lipinska
 1976: La Victoire en chantant, directed by Jean-Jacques Annaud
 1977: Le juge fayard, dit Le Shériff, directed by Yves Boisset
 1982: La Truite, directed by Joseph Losey
 1985: Folie suisse, directed by Christine Lipinska
 1986: On a volé Charlie Spencer, directed by Francis Huster
 1988: Baxter, directed by Jérôme Boivin with Lise Delamare
 1989: Thick Skinned, directed by Patricia Mazuy
 1989: L'Homme imaginé, directed by Patricia Bardon 
 1992: Tout ça... pour ça !, directed by Claude Lelouch with Fabrice Luchini
 1996: Madame Jacques sur la Croisette, directed by Emmanuel Finkiel with Shulamit Adar
 1998: Rembrandt, directed by Charles Matton with Klaus Maria Brandauer
 1999: La Vie moderne, directed by Laurence Ferreira Barbosa with Isabelle Huppert
 2000: De l'histoire ancienne, directed by Orso Miret with Yann Goven
 2000: Après la réconciliation, directed by Anne-Marie Miéville with Anne-Marie Miéville and Jean-Luc Godard
 2001: C'est la vie, directed by Jean-Pierre Améris with Jacques Dutronc
 2002: Elle est des nôtres, directed by Siegrid Alnoy with Sasha Andres
 2003: Je suis un assassin, directed by Thomas Vincent with François Cluzet
 2003: San-Antonio, directed by Frédéric Auburtin with Gérard Lanvin 
 2005: Itinéraires, directed by Christophe Otzenberger
 2006: Le Passager de l'été, directed by Florence Moncorgé-Gabin with Catherine Frot and Laura Smet
 2006: A City Is Beautiful at Night, directed by Richard Bohringer with Richard Bohringer
 2006: Hors de prix, directed by Pierre Salvadori with Audrey Tautou et Gad Elmaleh
 2006: My Best Friend, directed by Patrice Leconte with Daniel Auteuil and Dany Boon
 2007: Écoute le temps (Fissures), directed by Alantė Kavaitė with Emilie, directed byquenne and Ludmila Mikaël
 2007: Nos retrouvailles, directed by David Oelhoffen with Jacques Gamblin and Nicolas Giraud
 2009: A Man and His Dog, directed by Francis Huster
 2009: Coco, directed by Gad Elmaleh
 2014: Le Dernier Diamant, directed by Éric Barbier with Bérénice Bejo and Yvan Attal

Television
 1974: Le Pain noir, directed by Serge Moati (feuilleton télévisé)
 1983: Diane Lanster, directed by Bernard Queysanne
 1995: Maigret et l'affaire Saint-Fiacre (téléfilm), directed by Denys de La Patellière : le comte de Saint-Fiacre
 1998: Victor Schoelcher, l'abolition, directed by Paul Vecchiali
 1999: Dessine-moi un jouet : Raoul Monge
 2004: Nature contre nature : M. Lorieux
 2005: Zodiaque : Maître Etienne Lefort
 2005: La Belle et le sauvage : Le commissaire Perrault
 2005: Les Rois maudits : Charles, Count of Valois
 2006: Chasse à l'homme avec Richard Berry
 2007: Le Vrai coupable, directed by Francis Huster
 2007: Le Lien, directed by Denis Malleval
 2007: Sous les vents de Neptune, directed by Josée Dayan: Adrien Danglard
 2009: L'Homme aux cercles bleus, directed by Josée Dayan
 2009: Mourir d'aimer, directed by Josée Dayan
 2009: Jusqu'à l'enfer, directed by Denis Malleval
 2009–present: : Commissaire Simon Magellan
 2017: Capitaine Marleau, directed by Josée Dayan : Thibault Le Preux (1 Episode)

Theatre 
Comedian
 1985: Le Cid, directed by Corneille, mise en scène Francis Huster, Théâtre Renaud-Barrault
 1987: Dom Juan, directed by Molière, mise en scène Francis Huster, Théâtre Renaud-Barrault
 1992: Suite royale d’après Crébillon fils et Denis Diderot, mise en scène Francis Huster, Théâtre Marigny
 1993: Le Cid, directed by Corneille, mise en scène Francis Huster 
 1998: Flip !, directed by Tom Rooney, mise en scène Roger Mirmont, Théâtre Fontaine

Metteur en scène
 1986: Diderot et l'abbé Barthélémy after Denis Diderot, Théâtre Renaud-Barrault

External links 
 

1947 births
Living people
People from Angers
French male film actors
French male stage actors
French male television actors
20th-century French male actors
21st-century French male actors